Grosvenor Chambers, at number 9 Collins Street, Melbourne, contained the first custom-built complex of artists' studios in Australia. The construction costs were almost £6,000 and the building opened in April 1888. The owner was Charles Stewart Paterson (1843-1917). He, in partnership with his brother James, had a high-end decorating business in Melbourne. Another brother was the painter John Ford Paterson who sometimes exhibited with the Heidelberg School artists.

The basement atelier was occupied initially by sculptor Percival Ball. The upper floor consisted of five well-lit artists' studios.  The ground floor housed the showroom for the Paterson’s decorative arts business. The middle floor had space for a costumier, fabric showroom and workshop.

Many notable artists rented a studio in the building or exhibited their work there. These include, Tom Roberts, Frederick McCubbin, Arthur Streeton, Percival Ball, Charles Francis Summers, Clara Southern, Jane Sutherland, Charles Conder, E. Phillips Fox, John Longstaff, Girolamo Nerli, Louis Abrahams, Rose Walker,  George Lambert, Ola Cohn, Dora Wilson, Max Meldrum, Mirka Mora and Albert Tucker. 

Notable photographers, such as Gordon De Lisle and Wolfgang Sievers, had rooms in the building in the 1950s.

Artists continued to rent studios there until the mid-1970s, when all but the facade of the building was demolished to make way for a high-rise office building.

References

Heidelberg School
Australian sculpture
History of Melbourne
Australian art
1888 establishments in Australia
Artists' studios in Australia
Landmarks in Melbourne
Collins Street, Melbourne
Demolished buildings and structures in Melbourne